Zhongba may refer to the following places in China:

 Zhongba County in Tibet
 Zhongba Township (lit. "Middle Dam") in Gansu